Cavalier is an American magazine that was launched by Fawcett Publications in 1952 and has continued for decades, eventually evolving into a Playboy-style men's magazine. It has no connection with the Frank Munsey pulp, The Cavalier, published in the early years of the 20th century.

In its original format, Cavalier was planned by Fawcett to feature novelettes and novel excerpts by Fawcett's Gold Medal authors, including Richard Prather and Mickey Spillane.

Editors
During the 1950s, the magazine was edited by James B. O'Connell (1952–1958) and Bob Curran (1959). Editors in the 1960s included Frederic A. Birmingham (1962), Frank M. Robinson, Robert Shea (1966), and Alan R. LeMond (1967). Maurice DeWalt was the editor in 1973.

Contributors
Authors in the 1950s included Jimmy Breslin, Henry Kuttner, Clyde Beatty ("Tigers on the Loose"), and Stanley P. Friedman. During the 1960s, the magazine featured such writers as Nelson Algren, Isaac Asimov, Ray Bradbury, Robert Coover, Leonard Feather, Bruce Jay Friedman, Richard Gehman, Nat Hentoff, John Clellon Holmes, William Bradford Huie, Garson Kanin, Paul Krassner, John D. MacDonald, Alberto Moravia, Thomas Pynchon, Robert Shelton, Isaac Bashevis Singer, Theodore Sturgeon, William Tenn, and Colin Wilson. Some stories were reprints, such as Roald Dahl's "Man from the South" in the June 1960 issue.

Film critic Manny Farber had a monthly column in the 1960s. Stephen King was a contributor during the 1970s, and his stories were also featured in Cavalier Yearbook.

Cartoonists and illustrators
Vaughn Bode's long-running comic-strip feature Deadbone/Deadbone Erotica/Erotica was published in Cavalier continuously (with the exception of April 1975) from May 1969 through August 1975. From September 1975 onwards, reprints of previously published Deadbone strips appeared, as Bode had died in July 1975. Other comics by Art Spiegelman, Robert Crumb, and Jay Lynch were also published at times. Illustrators included the Boston-based painter Norman Baer.

Illustrator/painter Robert McGinnis whose long illustration career had just started to take off around the beginning of the 1960s, painted some female figures (some of them nudes) for some of the Cavalier issues, with some verified issue examples being June, October, and December 1965.

Publishers
The magazine had several logo changes, and during the 1960s, it was taken over by the DuGent Publishing Corporation, which was located at 236 East 46th Street in New York City. In the 1980s, DuGent Publishing relocated their headquarters to Coral Gables, Florida.

Cavalier is currently published by Cavalier Publishing, LLC in Tampa, Florida.

References

External links
Cavalier (February, 1970): Sal Mineo interviewed by Bob Abel
Cover archive at Galactic Central

Literary magazines published in the United States
Men's magazines published in the United States
Monthly magazines published in the United States
Magazines established in 1952
Men's adventure magazines
Magazines published in New York City
Magazines published in Florida
Fawcett Publications